The discography of Alice in Chains, a Seattle-based rock band, consists of six studio albums, three extended plays (EP), three live albums, five compilations, two DVDs, 44 music videos, and 32 singles (as of September 2019).

Alice in Chains was formed in 1987 by guitarist Jerry Cantrell and drummer Sean Kinney, who then recruited bassist Mike Starr and singer Layne Staley. The band signed to Columbia Records in 1989 and released its first EP, We Die Young, in July 1990. Later that year, the band released its debut studio album, Facelift. The single "Man in the Box", which reached number 18 on the Mainstream Rock chart, helped Facelift achieve double Platinum status. The band toured in support of the album for two years before releasing the acoustic EP Sap in early 1992. In September 1992, Alice in Chains released Dirt. The critically acclaimed album, also the band's most successful, debuted at number six on the Billboard 200, and was certified quintuple Platinum. The band did not tour in support of Dirt for very long, due to Staley's drug addiction. While touring, Starr left the band due to personal reasons and was replaced by Mike Inez. 1994 saw the release of Alice in Chains' second acoustic EP, Jar of Flies. It entered the charts in the top slot, making it the first Alice in Chains release—and the first EP in history—to debut at number one. In 1995, the band released a self-titled album, which debuted at the top of the Billboard 200, and has since been awarded—along with Facelift—double Platinum status while Jar of Flies maintains Quadruple Platinum status. Alice in Chains entered a hiatus after not touring since the release of Dirt.

From 1996 to 2002, the band was mostly inactive, releasing two live albums, including the successful Unplugged, and three compilations. On April 19, 2002, Staley was found dead in his home after overdosing on heroin and cocaine, causing the group to break up. In 2005, the band reunited with new vocalist William DuVall. On April 25, 2009, it was announced that Alice in Chains had signed to Virgin/EMI making it the band's first label change in their 20-plus year career. Black Gives Way to Blue, the group's first album with DuVall, was released on September 29, 2009. In 2011, Alice in Chains began work on their fifth studio album, The Devil Put Dinosaurs Here, which was released on May 28, 2013. Alice in Chains' sixth studio album, Rainier Fog, was released on August 24, 2018.

As of 2019, Alice in Chains has had 18 Top 10 songs and five No. 1 hits on Billboards Mainstream Rock chart.

Albums

Studio albums

Live albums

Compilation albums

Extended plays

Singles

Soundtracks

Music videos

Videos

Guest appearances

Notes

See also
List of songs recorded by Alice in Chains

References

External links
Official website

Discography
Discographies of American artists
Heavy metal group discographies